, real name , was a Japanese ryūkōka singer.

He studied music as an enka-shi or a street musician. At that time, he was encouraged by Taro Shoji in Ginza. He signed with King Records in 1938. He debuted with song "Kokkyō no Haru" (国境の春, lit. "Spring at the Border") in 1939. He married Kiyoko Okuda in 1940. In 1944, during the Pacific War, he was dispatched to Ambon Island, but soon returned due to sickness.

After the war, his popularity grew, and he starred in Akogare no Hawaii kōro with Hibari Misora. However, he never performed at the Kohaku Uta Gassen partly because he attached importance to live performances.

Discography 
  : 1939
  : 1939
  : 1940
  : 1940
  : 1940
  : 1946
  : 1946
  : 1947
  : 1948
  : 1955

References 

1916 births
1970 deaths
People from Kisarazu
Musicians from Chiba Prefecture
Japanese male actors
20th-century Japanese male singers
20th-century Japanese singers
Japanese people of World War II